The 2018–19 Oral Roberts Golden Eagles men's basketball team represents Oral Roberts University during the 2018–19 NCAA Division I men's basketball season. The Golden Eagles are led by second-year head coach Paul Mills and play their home games at the Mabee Center in Tulsa, Oklahoma as members of The Summit League.

Previous season
The Golden Eagles finished the season 11–21, 5–9 in Summit League play to finish in a tie for fifth place. They lost in the quarterfinals of the Summit League tournament to Denver.

Roster

Schedule and results

|-
!colspan=9 style=| Regular season

|-
!colspan=9 style=| The Summit League regular season

|-
!colspan=9 style=| Summit League tournament

References

2018-19
2018–19 Summit League men's basketball season
2018 in sports in Oklahoma
2019 in sports in Oklahoma